Chu Wai Kwan (born 9 February 1999 in Hong Kong) is a Hong Kong professional footballer who currently plays as a forward for Hong Kong Premier League club Sham Shui Po, on loan from Eastern.

Youth career
Chu trained as a member of the Rangers academy while attending Yan Chai Hospital Tung Chi Ying Memorial Secondary School. He later moved to Chelsea Soccer School with whom he won the HKFA Youth Cup in 2015-16. Although he was invited by both Metro Gallery and South China to train with their respective first teams, he declined to do so until he finished high school.

Club career
Due to Chelsea Soccer School's partnership agreement with Happy Valley, Chu was registered as a Happy Valley player for the 2016-17 season. He scored 12 goals in helping the club win the Third Division title.

In July 2017, Chu signed with top flight club Dreams FC. He made his debut on 26 August, playing 12 minutes in a 1–1 draw against Tai Po.

In August 2019, Chu signed with Happy Valley again following the self relegation of Dreams FC.

On 9 August 2021, it was announced that Chu had signed with Eastern.

On 27 January 2023, Chu was loaned to Sham Shui Po for the remaining of the season.

Honours

Club
Happy Valley
Hong Kong Third Division: 2016–17

References

External links

Chu Wai Kwan at HKFA

1999 births
Living people
Hong Kong people
Hong Kong footballers
Hong Kong Premier League players
Happy Valley AA players
Dreams Sports Club players
Eastern Sports Club footballers
Sham Shui Po SA players
Association football forwards
Association football midfielders